The international standard ISO 233 establishes a system for romanization of Arabic and Syriac. It was supplemented by ISO 233-2 in 1993.

1984 edition 

The table below shows the consonants for the Arabic language.

ISO 233-2:1993 
ISO 233-2:1993 is an ISO schema for the simplified transliteration of Arabic characters into Roman characters.

This transliteration system was adopted as an amendment to ISO 233:1984. It is used mainly in library context, and was introduced because ISO 233 was not meeting the indexing purposes, which are essential for the consistency of library catalogs.

According to ISO 233-2(1993), Arabic words are vocalized prior to romanization.

ISO 233-2 is used in French libraries and in North African libraries, and is recommended by ISSN for establishing key titles when cataloguing serials.

ISO 233-3:1999 
ISO 233-3:1999 is dedicated to "Persian language – Simplified transliteration".

ISO/R 233:1961 
ISO/R 233 is an earlier standard that has been withdrawn.

See also 
 Arabic transliteration
 DIN 31635
 List of ISO transliterations

External links 
 Transliteration of Non-Roman Scripts -A collection of writing systems and transliteration tables, by Thomas T. Pedersen.  PDF reference charts include ISO 233.
 ISO 233:1984
 ISO 233-2:1993
 ISO 233-3:1999

References

00233
00233
Romanization of Arabic
Syriac language
Syriac alphabet
Neo-Aramaic languages
Semitic writing systems